The Primary School of Othonoi is a public school of Othonoi, in northwestern Greece. It is a stone-built neoclassical building, a donation of the Greek benefactor Andreas Syngros.

References

Schools in Greece
Othonoi
1912 establishments in Greece